= Armani Jeans =

Armani Jeans may refer to:

- Armani Jeans (brand), a jeans brand by fashion house Giorgio Armani
- Olimpia Milano, an Italian basketball club currently known as Armani Jeans Milano for sponsorship reasons
